Chanez Ayadi (born February 8, 1994, in Béjaïa) is an Algerian volleyball player.

Club information
Current club :  NC Bejaia

References

1994 births
Living people
Volleyball players from Béjaïa
Algerian women's volleyball players
Liberos
21st-century Algerian people